Neil Newbon (born August 14, 1978) is an English actor known for playing Elijah Kamski and Gavin Reed in Detroit: Become Human and Karl Heisenberg in Resident Evil Village.

Biography
Newbon was born in Solihull, West Midlands, the son of ITV sportscaster Gary Newbon. His brother Lawrence works as a cameraman.

Professional career
In 1998, Newbon appeared in series one of the BBC Two comedy series "Goodness Gracious Me" as James the waiter in the programme's notable "Going for an English" sketch. He has appeared in numerous films. He voiced a tank driver in Jackboots on Whitehall, which starred Ewan McGregor. He starred in music videos for the Now Voyager Mix of "You Got the Love" by The Source and Candi Staton in 2006 and "Kingdom of Rust" by Doves in 2009. In 2012, he joined the cast of Channel 4 soap opera Hollyoaks, in the role of Simon Walker.  

In 2018, he provided his likeness and motion capture to CyberLife founder Elijah Kamski and Detective Gavin Reed in the video game Detroit: Become Human.

Personal life
Newbon is a co-founder of the training facility Performance Captured Academy, which offers courses on motion capture for aspiring actors. 
In 2012, he was previously married to English film director China Moo-Young and together have one daughter. Since 2018, he has been in a relationship with Performance Captured Academy co-founder Saleta Losada.

Filmography

Film

Television

Video games

References

External links

1978 births
Living people
English male film actors
English male television actors
English male video game actors
English male voice actors
British twins
English people of Scottish descent
20th-century English male actors
21st-century English male actors
Male actors from Birmingham, West Midlands